Billboard Top Race Records of 1948 is a year-end chart compiled by Billboard magazine ranking the year's top race records based on record sales.Billboard assigned point totals to each record based on its sales. 

"Long Gone", an instrumental by Sonny Thompson with the "Sharps and Flats" was the year's No. 1 race record with 195 points. Thompson had another instrumental record, "Late Freight", that made the year-end list at No. 13.

"Good Rocking Tonight" by Wynonie Harris finished in the No. 2 spot with 145 points. The song anticipated elements of rock and roll music and has been cited as one of the candidates for the title of the first rock and roll record.

"Tomorrow Night", a blues record by Lonnie Johnson, finished third with 129 points. The record was a remake of a 1939 version by Horace Heidt. Johson's version held the No. 1 spot on the race chart for seven weeks and crossed over to reach the No. 19 spot on the pop chart.

"Nature Boy" by King Cole, with an orchestra conducted by Frank De Vol, was the only song to be included in Billboards year-end lists for both race and pop records. It finished at No. 11 among the year's race records and No. 14 among the pop records.

King Records led all other labels with six records on the year-end chart, followed by Miracle and Capitol with three records each.

See also
Billboard year-end top singles of 1948
1948 in music

References

1948 record charts
Billboard charts
1948 in American music